Jo Hyeong (1606–1679) was a scholar-official of the Joseon Dynasty Korea in the 17th century.

He was also diplomat and ambassador, representing Joseon interests in the 6th Edo period diplomatic mission to the Tokugawa shogunate in Japan.

1655 mission to Japan
In 1655 King Hyojong of Joseon sent a mission to the shogunal court of Tokugawa Ietsuna.  This diplomatic mission functioned to the advantage of both the Japanese and the Koreans as a channel for developing a political foundation for trade.

The delegation was explicitly identified by the Joseon court as a "Communication Envoy" (tongsinsa).  The mission was understood to signify that relations were "normalized."

Jo Hyeong was the chief envoy of the Joseon embassy  which was received in the shogunate court at Edo from where the delegation were taken in a procession to the Tōshō-gū at Nikkō.

Recognition in the West
Jo Hyeong's historical significance was confirmed when his mission and his name were specifically mentioned in a widely distributed history published by the Oriental Translation Fund in 1834.

In western culture early published accounts of the Joseon kingdom are not extensive but they are found in Sangoku Tsūran Zusetsu (published in Paris in 1832) and in Nihon ōdai ichiran (published in Paris in 1834).  Joseon foreign relations and diplomacy are explicitly referenced in the 1834 work.

The term "Joseon Dynasty" is equivalent to "Joseon kingdom" and it is a preferred usage in the 21st century.

See also
 Joseon diplomacy
 Joseon missions to Japan
 Joseon tongsinsa

Notes

References

 Daehwan, Noh.  "The Eclectic Development of Neo-Confucianism and Statecraft from the 18th to the 19th Century," Korea Journal (Winter 2003).
 Lewis, James Bryant. (2003). Frontier contact between chosŏn Korea and Tokugawa Japan. London: Routledge. 
 Titsingh, Isaac, ed. (1834). [Siyun-sai Rin-siyo/Hayashi Gahō, 1652], Nipon o daï itsi ran; ou,  Annales des empereurs du Japon.  Paris: Oriental Translation Fund of Great Britain and Ireland.  OCLC  84067437
 Toby, Ronald P. (1991).  State and Diplomacy in Early Modern Japan: Asia in the Development of the Tokugawa Bakufu. Stanford: Stanford University Press. 
 Walker, Brett L.  "Foreign Affairs and Frontiers in Early Modern Japan: A Historiographical Essay," Early Modern Japan. Fall, 2002, pp. 44–62, 124-128.
 Walraven, Boudewijn and Remco E. Breuker. (2007). Korea in the middle: Korean studies and area studies; Essays in Honour of Boudewijn Walraven. Leiden: CNWS Publications. ;

External links
 Joseon Tongsinsa Cultural Exchange Association ; 
 조선통신사연구 (Journal of Studies in Joseon Tongsinsa) 

1606 births
1679 deaths
17th-century Korean people
Korean diplomats
Pungyang Jo clan